The tram route 44 in Brussels, Belgium is a tram route operated by the STIB/MIVB, which connects the Montgomery metro station in the municipality of Woluwe-Saint-Pierre to the Flemish municipality of Tervuren almost exclusively by running on the Avenue de Tervuren.

Starting from the underground terminus at the Montgomery metro station, the route exits the tunnel to run on the Avenue de Tervueren, along with tram route 39. It then runs along the Woluwe park, Parmentier park and the Mellaerts ponds. At the crossroad with the Avenue Alfred Madoux/Alfred Madouxlaan, the route 39 turns left but the route 44 continues on the Avenue de Tervuren. At the crossroad with the Chaussée de Tervuren/Tervuursesteenweg the route actually runs along the Avenue de Tervuren on reserved track. The route subsequently crosses the Brussels Ring at the Quatre Bras and then runs along the Avenue de Tervuren again in the municipality of Tervuren, up to the crossroad with the Oppemstraat. There, the route runs on reserved track up to the last stop Tervuren Station.

See also
List of Brussels tram routes

References

External links
STIB/MIVB official website

44
Kraainem
Tervuren
Wezembeek-Oppem
Woluwe-Saint-Pierre